The Kansas International Film Festival (KIFF) is a non-profit Kansas-based organization that promotes independent and vintage cinema through film expos. The festival is held every fall.

In 2001, KIFF received a 501(c)(3) designation under the corporation name of Photoplay, Inc. Photoplay's board of directors consists of filmmakers, file distributors, educators, theatre owners, and film historians. The Fine Arts Theatre Group provides the venues for KIFF viewing.

KIFF serves the movie idealist by focusing on documentary, narrative, and animated independent films. The festival closes with the presentation of the following awards: Jury Award for Best Narrative, Jury Award for Best Documentary, Audience Award for Best Narrative, Audience Award for Best Documentary, and the Independent Vision Award. The winners are selected by panels of local filmmakers, film educators, and critics. KIFF attracts local, regional, and national works, along with visiting actors, actress, and filmmakers. The festival also educates the public about cultural and economic issues affecting independent and vintage cinema.

In 2010, MovieMaker magazine named KIFF as "one of the top 25 film festivals worth their entry fee."

Past winners

2019 

 Jury Award Best Narrative-Postal, Tyler Falbo
 Jury Award Best Documentary-Right To Harm, Annie Speicher, Matt Wechsler
 Audience Award Best Narrative-Silo
 Audience Award Best Animation-Two Balloons, Mark C. Smith

2013
 Jury Award Best Narrative - K Effect: Stalin's Editor, Valenti Figueres
 Jury Award Best Documentary - Small Thing, Jessica Vale                    
 Audience Award Best Narrative - Construction, Malcolm Goodwin   
 Audience Award Best Documentary - Blood Brother, Steve Hooker

2012
 Jury Award Best Narrative -  The Ghastly Love of Johnny X, Paul Bunnell
 Jury Award Best Documentary - Dave, Eric Geadelmann

2011
 Audience Award Best Narrative - eMANcipation, Philipp Müller-Dorn
 Audience Award Best Documentary - Lesson Plan, David H. Jeffery , Philip Neel

2010
 Jury Award Best Narrative - Soul at Peace, Vladimír Balko
 Jury Award Best Documentary - Holy Wars, Stephen Marshall

2009
 Jury Award Best Narrative -  16 to Life, Becky Smith
 Jury Award Best Documentary -  Vincent: A Life in Color, Jennifer Burns

2008
 Jury Award Best Narrative -  N/A
 Jury Award Best Documentary - The Flyboys, Rocco DeVilliers

2007
 Jury Award Best Narrative - Midnight Clear, Dallas Jenkins
 Jury Award Best Documentary - The Edge of Eden: Living with Grizzlies, Jeff Turner, Sue Turner

2006
 Jury Award Best Narrative -  Mojave Phone Booth, John Putch
 Jury Award Best Documentary - Hand of God, Joe Cultrera

References

Film festivals in Kansas
Culture of Overland Park, Kansas